CNN en Español is a Pan-American Spanish-language news channel, owned by CNN Global, a news division for Warner Bros. Discovery. It was launched on pay television, on March 17, 1997.

History

CNN en Español before 1997
In 1988, CNN began producing news in Spanish with Noticiero CNN, aimed at Spanish-speaking audiences in the United States and Latin America.

In 1992, CNN International started the Noticiero CNN Internacional, the first in Spanish on that channel. Other programs in Spanish were Las Noticias and Noticias México, all of them presented by the Colombian Patricia Janiot and the Uruguayan Jorge Gestoso, and with the direction of Rolando Santos. The following year, CNN en Español Radio was launched.

Launch (1997)
On March 17, 1997, CNN en Español began broadcasting 24 hours a day. In addition, the chain's production centers begin to operate in Buenos Aires and Havana. The correspondent in the Cuban capital was the first office of a U.S. organization on the island.

2010 change
In 2010, CNN en Español debuted a new logo, with a new programming lineup.

2022
On February 14, 2022, CNN en Español started broadcasts in 16:9.

Availability
CNN en Español is available throughout Hispanic America, and the United States. In Canada, a number of the network's shows are simulcast on Univision Canada. In Venezuela and Nicaragua, the channel is available via live-streaming on YouTube and its official website since 2017 and 2022 respectively.

On February 15, 2017, Venezuela's National Commission of Telecommunications (Conatel) blocked CNN en Español from any national TV provider, saying a report from the network regarding passport fraud was "a threat to the peace and democratic stability" of the nation. Conatel additionally blocked sister network CNN International and BBC World News on April 30, 2019 during an uprising attempt.

On September 22, 2022, CNN en Español was taken off the air from all cable providers in Nicaragua by order of the Nicaraguan Institute of Telecommunications and Post Office (TELCOR).

Programming

Live coverage
CNN en Español provides live coverage of some news events, and from 2016 until 2021, carried the Spanish-language audio (though the video remains the regular English presentation) for Major League Baseball postseason games carried by sister network TBS only in the United States and Latin America. CNN en Español features newscasts throughout the day. In 2022, the coverage moved to MLB Network, with added graphical translation.

Personalities

Senior Vice President
Cynthia Darr Hudson - VP

Anchors
Carmen Aristegui
Gabriela Frías
Alejandra Gutiérrez Oraa
Elizabeth Pérez
Mariela Encarnación
Fernando del Rincón
Juan Carlos Arciniegas
Andres Oppenheimer

Columnists

Ana Navarro
Andrés Oppenheimer
Álvaro Leonel Ramazzini Imeri
Alan Smolinisky
Austen Ivereigh
Carlos Alberto Montaner
Geovanny Vicente
Maria Cardona
Frida Ghitis
Pedro Bordaberry
Roberto Izurieta
Octavio Pescador
Sylvia Garcia
Marcelo Longobardi

See also
List of Spanish-language television networks in the United States

References

External links

CNN Live

CNN
Warner Bros. Discovery networks
Television networks in Mexico
XM Satellite Radio channels
Sirius Satellite Radio channels
Sirius XM Radio channels
Television channels and stations established in 1997
Spanish-language television networks in the United States

sv:CNN en Español